Linji may refer to:

Linji Yixuan (died 866), Chinese Zen Buddhist monk
Linji school, sect of Chinese Zen